Unity Township is one of the eighteen townships of Columbiana County, Ohio, United States. The 2010 census reported 9,957 people living in the township, 3,971 of whom were in the unincorporated portions of the township.

Geography
Located in the northeastern corner of the county, it borders the following townships:
Springfield Township, Mahoning County - north
North Beaver Township, Lawrence County, Pennsylvania - northeast corner
Little Beaver Township, Lawrence County, Pennsylvania - east
Darlington Township, Beaver County, Pennsylvania - southeast
Middleton Township - south
Elkrun Township - southwest corner
Fairfield Township - west
Beaver Township, Mahoning County - northwest corner

One city and two villages are located in Unity Township:
The eastern tip of the city of Columbiana, in the northwest
The village of East Palestine, in the southeast
The village of New Waterford, in the west

Name and history

It is the only Unity Township statewide.

The township was organized in 1806.

Government
The township is governed by a three-member board of trustees, who are elected in November of odd-numbered years to a four-year term beginning on the following January 1. Two are elected in the year after the presidential election and one is elected in the year before it. There is also an elected township fiscal officer, who serves a four-year term beginning on April 1 of the year after the election, which is held in November of the year before the presidential election. Vacancies in the fiscal officership or on the board of trustees are filled by the remaining trustees.

Township Trustees
Kathy McCarthy, Chairwoman
Bryan R. Henderson, Vice Chairman
Terry L. McElroy

Fiscal Officer
Nancy G. Herr

References

External links
County website

Townships in Columbiana County, Ohio
Townships in Ohio
1806 establishments in Ohio